Marc Douglas Berardo is an American singer-songwriter. He was born in Port Chester, New York, and raised in Rye, New York. Berardo is a notable alumni of the Iona Preparatory School in New Rochelle, New York. His songwriting and performing career began while attending Northeastern University in Boston, Massachusetts. His songwriting and performing career began while attending Northeastern University in Boston, Massachusetts and was fine tuned as a staff performer at the Milltop Tavern and Listening Room, St Augustine, FL from 1989 to 1995. Berardo is also known as a member of the Northeast country rock group, Chris Berardo and the Desberardos.

Berardo's song writing has been compared to that of John Prine, James Taylor and Jackson Browne and an acoustic Bruce Springsteen, among others. Many of his songs are set in seaside towns. Berardo has been referred to as a possessing a "lonesome, clear voice easily carries an aching beauty" as well displaying musicianship with "fluid, melodic string arrangements based on his acoustic guitar". He currently resides in Westerly, Rhode Island.

Recognition 

Berardo has been recognized in national song contests and showcases. He was awarded the 2014 Michael Terry People's Choice Award at the Wildflower! Arts and Music Festival Performing Songwriter Contest. Berardo was also finalist in the 2015 South Florida Folk Festival Songwriting Competition, the 2014 Grassy Hill Kerrville New Folk Songwriting Competition at the Kerrville Folk Festival, the 2014 SolarFest Songwriter Showcase, and the 2010 Sisters Folk Festival. Along with Bob Sima, he was awarded the first Rams Head on Stage "Rammie Award" for Show of the Year at Rams Head on Stage in 2013.

Radio 

Quiet Places (featuring Red Molly) Passing Through and Ruby from the Downhauler CD made the FOLKDJ-L radio list of Top Albums and Songs of April 2011. My Mistakes (co-written with Abbie Gardner of Red Molly ) and My Friend from Whalebone made the Folk DJ radio list of the Top Folk Albums, Songs, Artists and Labels of September 2013. Program Director of The Village (Sirius XM) Mary Sue Twohy included Downhauler on her 2011 list of favorite soundtracks. In September 2015, Mary Sue hosted Berardo on The Village Folk show that she later featured on a rebroadcast of 2015 listener favorites.

Touring 

As a working musician, Berardo tours year round. He has shared stages with a number of well recognized artists and performers including: The Doobie Brothers; John Haitt; Red Molly, Livingston Taylor, Cliff Eberhardt, Kevin Welch, Guy Clark, The Pousette-Dart Band and Jimmy LaFave.  In 2018, Berardo performed in the round with Dan Navarro, Kevin Gordon and Shannon McNally at the Bluebird Café in Nashville, TN.

Discography 

 Further On Tomorrow, Hayloft Records, 1998
 Second Chance, Hayloft Records, 2000
 As You Make Your Way, Hayloft Records, 2003
 Harbor, Prime Numbers Recordings, 2005
 Downhauler, Horizon Music Group, 2011
 Whalebone, Milo Productions, 2013

References

External links 
 Marc Douglas Berardo Official Website
 {http://www.desberardo.com  Chris Berardo and The Desberardos]

Living people
1969 births
American folk singers
American male singer-songwriters
Fast Folk artists
People from Westerly, Rhode Island
Singers from Rhode Island
Singer-songwriters from New York (state)
Songwriters from Rhode Island
Iona Preparatory School alumni